Hmangin may refer to several places in Burma:

Hmangin, Banmauk
Hmangin, Homalin